Kodiyeri Balakrishnan (16 November 1953 – 1 October 2022) was an Indian politician of the Communist Party of India (Marxist). He was the secretary of the CPI(M) Kerala State Committee from 2015 to 2022. He stepped down from the position of state secretary due to his failing health. He was the Chief Editor of the Malayalam newspaper Deshabhimani.

Balakrishnan was the Deputy Leader of the Opposition in the Kerala Legislative Assembly from 2001 to 2006 and again from 2011 to 2016, and also served as the State Minister of Home Affairs and Tourism from 2006 to 2011 under the Achuthananadan Ministry. He represented Thalassery State Assembly Constituency in the Kerala Legislative Assembly from 1982 to 1991 and again from 2001 to 2016.

Political life
Balakrishnan entered politics through the student wing of the CPI(M) in 1970. He was Secretary of the Kerala State Committee of the Students' Federation of India (SFI) and its All India Joint Secretary between 1973 and 1979. During the time of the emergency, Kodiyeri Balakrishnan was imprisoned under MISA for 16 months.

From 1980 to 1982, he was the Kannur District President of Democratic Youth Federation of India (DYFI). He was a CPI (M) Politburo member and was CPI (M) Parliamentary Party Deputy Leader. He was elected as an MLA to Kerala Legislative Assembly in 1982, 1987, 2001, 2006 and 2011 from Thalassery.
He was Minister of Home affairs of Kerala during the time of V S Achudanandan Ministry.
On 23 February 2015, he was elected as the Secretary of the Communist Party of India (Marxist) Kerala State Committee for a period of 3 years. He was re-elected for a second term as a State Secretary in 2018 and for a third term in March 2022. On 28 August 2022, he stepped down from the position due to failing health and was succeeded by M. V. Govindan.

Personal life and death
Balakrishnan was born in Kodiyeri, Thalassery to Kunjunni Kurup and Narayani Amma on 16 November 1953. He studied in Kodiyeri Junior Basic School and Oniyan High School. He became active in politics while studying at Mahatma Gandhi Government Arts College, Mahé and was active in University College, Thiruvananthapuram.

In 1980, he married S. R. Vinodini, daughter of ex-MLA M. V. Rajagopalan Master and had two children, Binoy Kodiyeri and Bineesh Kodiyeri.

Balakrishnan was diagnosed with pancreatic cancer and admitted in Apollo Hospital, Chennai from 28 August 2022 in view of worsening health. He died on 1 October 2022, at the age of 68.

References

External links

Biography of Kodiyeri Balakrishnan on the CPIM website

1953 births
2022 deaths
People from Thalassery
Malayali politicians
Communist Party of India (Marxist) politicians from Kerala
Kerala MLAs 1982–1987
Kerala MLAs 1987–1991
Kerala MLAs 2001–2006
Kerala MLAs 2011–2016
Kerala MLAs 2006–2011